Ura-Guba, also known as Ura, is a rural locality (a selo) in Kolsky District of Murmansk Oblast, Russia, located beyond the Arctic Circle at a height of  above sea level. Population: 517 (2010 Census).

History
It was founded in the 1860s—the decade when the Murman Coast was actively being settled.

By the April 20, 1921 Decision of the Plenary Session of Murmansky Uyezd Executive Committee, Ura-Guba was transferred from Novozerskaya to Alexandrovskaya Volost and became the administrative center of Ursky (Ura-Gubsky) Selsoviet.

On September 11, 1938, Ura-Guba was made the administrative center of Polyarny District by the Decree of the Presidium of the Supreme Soviet of the Russian SFSR. When Polyarny District was abolished on July 9, 1960, Ura-Guba became a part of Kolsky District.

References

Notes

Sources

Rural localities in Murmansk Oblast
Kolsky District
